The women's 200 metres at the 2018 World Para Athletics European Championships was held at the Friedrich-Ludwig-Jahn-Sportpark in Berlin from 20 to 26 August. 12 classification finals are held, all over this distance.

Medalists

See also
List of IPC world records in athletics

References

200 metres
2018 in women's athletics
200 metres at the World Para Athletics European Championships